The Tunnel is a 1933 French-German science fiction film directed by Curtis Bernhardt and starring Jean Gabin, Madeleine Renaud and Robert Le Vigan. It was the French language version of the German film The Tunnel, with a different cast and some changes to the plot. Both were followed in 1935 by an English version. Such Multiple-language versions were common in the years immediately following the introduction of sound, before the practice of dubbing had come to dominate international releases. Germany and France made a significant number of films together at this time.

The film is an adaptation of Bernhard Kellermann's 1913 novel Der Tunnel about the construction of a vast tunnel under the Atlantic Ocean connecting Europe and America. The film's Jewish director Bernhardt had fled Germany following the Nazi takeover, but returned briefly to shoot exterior scenes after being granted special permission by the German government.

Cast
 Jean Gabin as Allan Mac Allan  
 Madeleine Renaud as Mary Mac Allan  
 Robert Le Vigan as Brooce, un ouvrier félon  
 Edmond Van Daële as Le contremaître  
 André Nox as Lloyd  
 Pierre Nay as Hobby  
 Gustaf Gründgens as Woolf  
 André Bertic as Gordon  
 Philippe Richard as Harryman  
 Raymonde Allain as Ethel Lloyd  
 Victor Vina as L'orateur
 Henri Valbel as Un ouvrier  
 Alexandre Arnoux   
 William Burke
 Henry Trévoux

See also 
 1933 in science fiction

References

Bibliography 
 Phillips, Alastair. City of Darkness, City of Light: Émigré Filmmakers in Paris, 1929-1939. Amsterdam University Press, 2004.

External links 
 

1933 films
Films of the Weimar Republic
French science fiction films
German science fiction films
French black-and-white films
1930s science fiction films
1930s French-language films
Films directed by Curtis Bernhardt
Films based on German novels
Films based on works by Bernhard Kellermann
French multilingual films
German black-and-white films
1933 multilingual films
1930s French films
1930s German films